The Mississippi River Bridge is a combination of two individual bridges which are also known as the Cass Street Bridge and the Cameron Avenue Bridge, as well as the Big Blue Bridges. They connect downtown La Crosse, Wisconsin to Barron Island, crossing the east channel of the Mississippi River. Another bridge, the La Crosse West Channel Bridge connects Barron Island to La Crescent, Minnesota. The Mississippi River Bridge carries U.S. Routes 14 and 61 with WI 16. There is another bridge about four miles upstream, the I-90 Mississippi River Bridge that connects North La Crosse, French Island, and Dresbach, Minnesota.

The Cass Street Bridge opened Sept. 23, 1939; replacing the previous Vernon Street swing bridge which was heavily damaged following an automobile accident in 1935.  The original concrete deck was replaced by a metal deck in 1983; the deck was rehabilitated when the parallel Cameron Avenue Bridge opened in 2005.

See also
List of crossings of the Upper Mississippi River

References

External links
Mississippi River Bridge

Bridges over the Mississippi River
Bridges completed in 1939
Bridges completed in 2004
U.S. Route 61
Tied arch bridges in the United States
U.S. Route 14
Bridges of the United States Numbered Highway System
Cantilever bridges in the United States
Truss bridges in the United States

Bridges in Wisconsin
1939 establishments in Minnesota
1939 establishments in Wisconsin
Interstate vehicle bridges in the United States